Pedro Cunha (born 10 June 1983 in Rio de Janeiro) is a retired Brazilian male beach volleyball player. He partnered with Ricardo Santos at the 2012 Summer Olympics tournament.

References

1983 births
Living people
Brazilian men's beach volleyball players
Olympic beach volleyball players of Brazil
Beach volleyball players at the 2012 Summer Olympics
Volleyball players from Rio de Janeiro (city)
21st-century Brazilian people